Calodesma approximata is a moth of the family Erebidae. It was described by Hering in 1925. It is found in French Guiana and Colombia.

Subspecies
Calodesma approximata approximata (French Guiana)
Calodesma approximata niepelti Hering, 1928 (Colombia)

References

Calodesma
Moths of South America
Insects of South America
Moths described in 1925